The Long Walk of the Navajo, also called the Long Walk to Bosque Redondo, was the 1864 deportation and attempted ethnic cleansing of the Navajo people by the United States federal government. Navajos were forced to walk from their land in what is now Arizona to eastern New Mexico. Some 53 different forced marches occurred between August 1864 and the end of 1866. Some anthropologists claim that the "collective trauma of the Long Walk...is critical to contemporary Navajos' sense of identity as a people".

Introduction

The traditional Navajo homeland spans from Arizona through western New Mexico, where the Navajo had houses, planted crops, and raised livestock. There was a long historical pattern in the Southwest of groups or bands raiding and trading with each other, with treaties being made and broken. This included interactions between Navajo, Spanish, Mexican, Pueblos, Apache, Comanche, Ute, and later European Americans. Individual civilians and Native Americans could be victims of these conflicts and also instigate conflicts to serve their special interests.

Hostilities escalated between European Americans and Navajos following the scalping of the respected Navajo leader Narbona in 1849. In August 1851, Colonel Edwin Vose Sumner established Fort Defiance for the U.S. government (near present-day Window Rock, Arizona) and Fort Wingate (originally Fort Fauntleroy near Gallup, New Mexico). Prior to the Long Walk, there were a series of treaties signed in 1849, 1858, and 1861.

Navajo–Army conflicts before Long Walk

There are many examples of friction between invading European Americans and Navajo groups between 1846 and 1863. Manuelito (Hastiin Chʼil Haajiní) and Barboncito (Hastiin Dághaaʼ) reminded the Navajo that the Army was bringing in troops to wage war, it had flogged a Navajo messenger, and opened fire on tribal headsman Agua Chiquito, during talks for peace. They argued that the army had refused to bring in feed for their many animals at Ft. Defiance, took over the prime grazing land, and killed Manuelito's livestock that was there. On April 30, 1860, Manuelito and Barboncito with 1,000 Navajo warriors attacked the fort and almost took control.

Typical truces and treaties said the army would protect the Navajo. However, the army allowed other Native American tribes and Mexicans to steal livestock and capture Navajo to be used as slaves. A truce between the army and Navajo was signed on February 15, 1861. They were again promised protection, but as part of the truce, two of the Navajo's four sacred mountains were taken from them, as well as about one-third of their traditionally held land. In March, a company of 52 citizens led by Jose Manuel Sanchez drove off a bunch of Navajo horses, but Captain Wingate followed the trail and recovered the horses for the Navajo, who had killed Sanchez. Another group of settlers ravaged Navajo rancherias in the vicinity of Beautiful Mountain. Also during this time, a party of Mexicans and Pueblo Indians captured 12 Navajo in a raid, and three were brought in.

On August 9, 1861, Lt. Col. Manuel Antonio Chaves of the New Mexico Volunteer Militia took command of a garrison of three companies numbering 8 officers and 206 men at Fort Fauntleroy. Chaves was later accused of holding back supplies intended for the 1,000 or more Navajos that had remained close to the fort and was maintaining remarkably lax discipline. Horse races began on September 10 and continued into the late afternoon of September 13. Col. Chaves permitted Post Sutler A.  W.  Kavanaugh to supply liquor freely to the Navajos. There was a dispute about which horse won a race. A shot rang out, followed by a fusillade. Almost immediately 200 Navajo, well-armed and mounted, advanced toward the Guard, shooting at the men. They were fired upon by the soldiers and scattered, leaving 12 dead bodies and forty prisoners. On hearing this, Gen. Canby demanded a full report from Chaves, who did not comply. Col. Canby sent Captain Andrew W. Evans to the fort, named Fort Lyon on September 25, and he took command. Manuel Chaves, suspended from command, was confined to the limits of Albuquerque pending court-martial. (The charges were dismissed after two months.) In February 1861, Manuel Chaves took the field with 400 militia and ransacked Navajo land, basically without federal authority.

Civil War and Kit Carson

With Confederate troops moving into southern New Mexico, Col. Canby sent Agent John Ward into Navajo lands to persuade any who might be friendly to move to a central encampment near the village of Cubero where they would be offered the protection of the government. Ward was also instructed to warn all Navajos who refused to come in that they would be treated as enemies; he was partly successful. Captain Evans was overseeing the abandonment of Fort Lyon and had been told that the new policy would be that the Navajo had to be removed to settlements or pueblos, mentioning the region of the Little Colorado west of Zuni as possibly an ideal place. In November, some Navajo were raiding again. On December 1, Col. Canby wrote to his superior in St.  Louis that "recent occurrences in the Navajo country have so demoralized and broken up [the Navajo] nation that there is now no choice between their absolute extermination or their removal and colonization at points so remote...as to isolate them entirely from the inhabitants of the Territory.
Aside from all considerations of humanity, the extermination of such a people will be the work of the greatest difficulty".

By 1862, the Union Army had pushed the Confederates down the Rio Grande. The United States government again turned its attention to the Navajos, determined to eliminate Navajo raiding and raids on the Navajo. James H. Carleton was ordered to relieve Canby as the Commander for the New Mexico Military Department in September 1862. Carleton gave the orders to Colonel Christopher "Kit" Carson to proceed to Navajo territory and to receive the Navajo surrender on July 20, 1863. When no Navajos showed up, Carson and another officer entered Navajo territory in an attempt to persuade Navajos to surrender and used a scorched earth policy to starve the Navajo out of their traditional homeland and force them to surrender. By early 1864 when thousands of Navajo began surrendering to the Army. Some Navajos refused to surrender to the U.S.  Army. These groups scattered to Navajo Mountain, the Grand Canyon, the territory of the Chiricahua Apache, and to parts of Utah.

The Long Walk

Major General James H. Carleton was assigned to the New Mexico Territory in the fall of 1862, it is then that he would subdue the Navajos of the region and force them on the long walk to Bosque Redondo. Upon being assigned the territory Carleton set boundaries in which the Navajos would not engage in any sort of conflict. They were prohibited from trespassing onto lands, raiding neighboring tribes, and engaging in warfare with both the Spaniards and European Americans. A majority of the Navajos were abiding by these requirements but a band of Navajo freelancing raiding parties broke these rules, for which the entire tribe was penalized. In the eyes of Carleton, he was unsuccessful and enlisted outside resources for aid including famous mountain man Kit Carson.

Carson also enlisted neighboring tribes in aiding his campaign to capture as many Navajos as he could. One tribe that proved to be most useful was the Utes. The Utes were very knowledgeable of the lands of the Navajos, and were very familiar with Navajo strongholds as well. Carson launched his full-scale assault on the Navajo population in January 1864. He destroyed everything in his path, eradicating the way of life of the Navajo people. Hogans were burned to the ground, livestock was killed off, and irrigated fields were destroyed. Navajos who surrendered were taken to Fort Canby and those who resisted were murdered. Some Navajos were able to escape Carson's campaign but were soon forced to surrender due to starvation and the freezing temperature of the winter months.

The "Long Walk" started at the beginning of spring 1864. (Bosque Redondo is Spanish for "round forest"—in New Mexican Spanish a bosque means a river-bottom forest usually containing cottonwood trees.) The march was one that was very difficult and pushed many Navajos to their breaking point, including death. The distance itself was cruel, but the fact that they did not receive any aid from the soldiers was devastating. Not every single person was in prime condition to trek 400 miles. Many began the walk exhausted and malnourished, others were not properly clothed and were not in the least prepared for such a long journey. Neither sympathy nor remorse were given to the Navajos. They were never informed as to where they were going, why they were being relocated, and how long it would take to get there. One account passed through generations within the Navajos shows the attitude of the U.S. Army as follows:

It was said that those ancestors were on the Long Walk with their daughter, who was pregnant and about to give birth [...] the daughter got tired and weak and couldn't keep up with the others or go further because of her condition. So my ancestors asked the Army to hold up for a while and to let the woman give birth, but the soldiers wouldn't do it. They forced my people to move on, saying that they were getting behind the others. The soldier told the parents that they had to leave their daughters behind. "Your daughter is not going to survive, anyway; sooner or later she is going to die," they said in their own language. "Go ahead," the daughter said to her parents, "things might come out all right with me," But the poor thing was mistaken, my grandparents used to say. Not long after they had moved on, they heard a gunshot from where they had been a short time ago.

At least 200 died during the 18-day, 300-mile (500-km) trek. Between 8,000 and 9,000 people were settled on an area of 40 square miles (104 km2), with a peak population of 9,022 by the spring of 1865.

There were as many as 50 groups taking one of seven known routes. They each took a different path but were on the same trail. When returning to the Navajo lands, they reformed their group to become one; this group was ten miles (16 km) long. Some of these Navajos escaped and hid with Apaches that were running from Gen. Crook on what is known as Cimmaron Mesa southeast of present-day NM Highway 6 and I-40; later they relocated to Alamo Springs northwest of Magdalena, NM and are known as the Alamo Band of the Diné (Navajos). Nelson Anthony Field who had a trading post made a trip to DC to lobby for a reservation for this Band and it was granted. This Band is part Navajo and part Apache.

Slavery
The campaign to subdue the Navajo by the Army was supplemented by raids by New Mexican and Ute slavers who fell on isolated bands of Navajo, killing the men, taking the women and children captive, and capturing horses and livestock. During the army campaign the Ute scouts attached to the army unit engaged in this activity and left destruction of Navajo infrastructure to the main army unit. Following the surrender of the Navajo, the Utes continued to raid the Navajo as did New Mexican slavers. A large number of slaves were taken and sold throughout the region.

Bosque Redondo

Like some internment camps involving several tribes, the Bosque Redondo had serious problems. About 400 Mescalero Apaches were placed there before the Navajos. The Mescaleros and the Navajo had a long tradition of raiding each other; the two tribes had many disputes during their encampment. Furthermore, the initial plan was for around 5,000 people, certainly not 10,000 men, women, and children. Water and firewood were major issues from the start; the water was brackish and the round grove of trees was quite small. Nature and humans both caused crop failures every year. The corn crop was infested with army worms and failed repeatedly. The Pecos River flooded and washed out the head gates of the irrigation system. In 1865 Navajo began leaving. By 1867 the remaining Navajo refused to plant a crop. Comanches raided them frequently, and they raided the Comanche, once stealing over 1,000 horses. The non-Indian settlers also suffered from the raiding parties who were trying to feed their starving people on the Bosque Redondo. And there was inept management of what supplies were purchased for the reservation. The army spent as much as $1.5 million a year to feed the Indians. In 1868 the experiment—meant to be the first Indian reservation west of Indian Territory—was abandoned.  A memorial site honoring those who were incarcerated at Bosque Redondo is located at Fort Sumner, New Mexico.

Treaty of Bosque Redondo

The Treaty of Bosque Redondo between the United States and many of the Navajo leaders was concluded at Fort Sumner on June 1, 1868.  Some of the provisions included establishing a reservation, restrictions on raiding, a resident Indian Agent and agency, compulsory education for children, the supply of seeds, agricultural implements and other provisions, rights of the Navajos to be protected, establishment of railroads and forts, compensation to tribal members, and arrangements for the return of Navajos to the reservation established by the treaty. The Navajo agreed for ten years to send their children to school and the U.S. government agreed to establish schools with teachers for every thirty Navajo children. The U.S. government also promised for ten years to give to the Navajos annually: clothing, goods, and other raw materials, not exceeding the value of five dollars per person, that the Navajos could not manufacture for themselves.

The signers of the document were: W. T. Sherman (Lt. General), S. F. Tappan (Indian Peace Commissioner), Navajos Barboncito (Chief), Armijo, Delgado, Manuelito, Largo, Herrero, Chiquito, Muerte de Hombre, Hombro, Narbono, Narbono Segundo and Ganado Mucho. Those who attested the document included Theo H. Dodd (Indian Agent) and B. S. Roberts (General 3rd Cav).

Return and end of Long Walk

On June 18, 1868, the once-scattered bands of people who call themselves Diné, set off together on the return journey, the "Long Walk" home. This is one of the few instances where the U.S. government permitted a tribe to return to their traditional boundaries. The Navajo were granted 3.5 million acres (14,000 km2) of land inside their four sacred mountains. The Navajo also became a more cohesive tribe after the Long Walk and were able to successfully increase the size of their reservation since then, to over 16 million acres (70,000 km2).

After relating 20 pages of material concerning the Long Walk, Howard Gorman, age 73 at the time, concluded:

Legacy

Health impacts
Not all the Navajo were captured and forced to take the long walk. Geneticists believe that a genetic bottleneck developed among the small, isolated, uncaptured groups. This produced the consequence of otherwise rare genetic diseases, for example Xeroderma pigmentosum, stemming from recessive genes achieving greater dominance.  An alternative put forth by some Navajo is that the sudden rise of xeroderma pigmentosum is directly related to wide spread uranium contamination.

In art

Navajo artist Richard K. Yazzie created a mural entitled Long Walk Home for the city of Gallup, New Mexico. It is located at the intersection of Third and Hill streets. It is rendered in the four "sacred colors", black, white, blue and yellow.

In literature
A supposed remnant of the Long Walk from Bosque Redondo, a rug called Woven Sorrow, figures prominently as a valuable antique in the plot of The Shape Shifter by Tony Hillerman, published in 2006. Anne Hillerman mentioned the Long Walk in a subsequent novel in the series, Cave of Bones (2018).

The story of the forced relocation is the setting of the youth fiction novel  The Girl Who Chased Away Sorrow, written in 1999 by Ann Turner.

Another novel depicting the Long Walk from Bosque Redondo is the Welsh novel I Ble'r aeth Haul y Bore? by Eurig Wyn. This Welsh language novel follows a number of characters (some historic, others created by the writer), and focuses not only on the Navajos, but also the Apache.

In the 1979 Stephen King novel The Long Walk (written under the pen name Richard Bachman) two Hopis are among one hundred teenage boys who participate in a competitive and voluntary death march which serves as a macabre annual spectacle in a totalitarian re-imagining of America.

Scott O'Dell's Newbury Award-winning book Sing Down the Moon (1970) depicts the forced migration of the Navajos to Bosque Redondo.

Gallery

See also
 California Genocide
 Trail of Tears
 Indian removal
 1837 Great Plains smallpox epidemic
 Comanche campaign
 Yavapai Wars
 Northern Cheyenne Exodus

Notes

References

Bibliography

External links

 
 
 New Mexico State University: The Long Walk

Navajo history
Forced migrations of Native Americans in the United States
Forced marches
1864 in the United States
1864 in Arizona Territory
Politically motivated migrations
Native American genocide
Native American history
Ethnic cleansing in the United States
Native American history of Arizona
Native American history of New Mexico
1865 in Arizona Territory
1866 in Arizona Territory
1864 in New Mexico Territory
1865 in New Mexico Territory
1866 in New Mexico Territory